Robert Loudon Steel (25 June 1888 – 1972) was a professional footballer who played for clubs including Greenock Morton, Port Glasgow Athletic, Tottenham Hotspur and Gillingham.

Career
Steel joined Tottenham Hotspur in 1908 from Port Glasgow (along with Willie Bulloch, who soon returned to Scotland) and played mainly in the inside left position, although he was versatile and willing to fill in several roles, including in defence. He featured in 245 games and scored 45 goals in all competitions (but not counting unofficial fixtures during World War I) before joining Gillingham at the end the conflict – featuring in the 1919–20 Southern Football League – and later becoming a referee.

International
While at Tottenham, he was selected for the annual Home Scots v Anglo-Scots trial match in 1909 but never played for Scotland at full international level.

Personal life
His brothers Danny and Alex were also footballers, with Danny also having a significant spell at Tottenham Hotspur and Alex spending time with FC Barcelona; the three siblings played together in one Football League fixture against Bradford City in January 1910.

References

1888 births
1972 deaths
Footballers from East Ayrshire
Scottish footballers
Greenock Morton F.C. players
Tottenham Hotspur F.C. players
Gillingham F.C. players
English Football League players
Port Glasgow Athletic F.C. players
Kilwinning Rangers F.C. players
Scottish Junior Football Association players
Scottish Football League players
Southern Football League players
Association football forwards